The Argentina women's junior national handball team is the national under-19 handball team of Argentina. Controlled by the Argentina Handball Federation that is an affiliate of the International Handball Federation and also a part of the South and Central America Handball Confederation, the team represents the country in international matches.

World Championship 
 Champions   Runners up   Third place   Fourth place

References

External links
 Official website

Handball in Argentina
Women's national junior handball teams
H